The Venta (Latvian pronunciation , Lithuanian , , , Livonian Vǟnta joug) is a river in north-western Lithuania and western Latvia. Its source is near Kuršėnai in the Lithuanian Šiauliai County. It flows into the Baltic Sea at Ventspils in Latvia.

On the territory of Lithuania along the Venta are cities Užventis, Kuršėnai, Venta, Viekšniai and Mažeikiai. In Latvia, the cities of Kuldīga, Piltene and Ventspils are located on the Venta river.

Venta has the widest waterfall in Europe — Venta Rapid.

Basin system
River has only one tributary longer than 100 km, the Abava. Other major tributaries include the Virvyčia (99.7 km) and the Varduva (96 km), which flows into the Venta at the Latvia–Lithuania border.

Smaller tributaries include the Avižlys, which runs for 20 kilometers and flows into the Venta River and the 30 kilometre Uogys which joins the Venta less than 1 km upstream of the Avižlys at Akmenė district municipality, Šiauliai County, northern Lithuania.

See also
 Ventas rumba

References

External links

Rivers of Lithuania
Rivers of Latvia
Venta River basin
International rivers of Europe